Alexandrovka is a rural locality (a settlement) in Novozhiznenskoye Rural Settlement, Anninsky District, Voronezh Oblast, Russia. The population was 120 as of 2010.

Geography 
Alexandrovka is located 41 km southeast of Anna (the district's administrative centre) by road. Gusevka 2nd is the nearest rural locality.

References 

Rural localities in Anninsky District